The  is a professional wrestling tag team championship created and promoted by the Japanese professional wrestling promotion Michinoku Pro Wrestling. 

There have been a total of 33 reigns shared between 25 different teams consisting of 33 individual champions. The current champions are Musashi and Kazuki Hashimoto who are in their first reign as a team.

Title history

Combined reigns

By team

By wrestler

See also
Michinoku Pro Wrestling
Tohoku Junior Heavyweight Championship

References

External links
Tohoku Tag Team Championship official page (in Japanese)
Tohoku Tag Team Championship on Wrestling-Titles.com
Tohoku Tag Team Championship on WrestlingData.com

Tag team wrestling championships
Michinoku Pro Wrestling championships